Robert Donington  (4 May 1907 – 20 January 1990) was a British musicologist and instrumentalist influential in the early music movement and in Wagner studies.

He was educated at St Paul's School, London, and studied at the University of Oxford. His expert knowledge of early instruments and the interpretation of pre-classical music owed much to a period of study with Arnold Dolmetsch at Haslemere, Surrey.  He was appointed OBE in the 1979 Birthday Honours.

He was born in Leeds, and died in Firle, Sussex at the age of 82.

Books
The Instruments of Music (1949).
Tempo and Rhythm in Bach's Organ Music (1960).
The Interpretation of Early Music (1963).
Wagner's Ring and its Symbols (1963).
String playing in baroque music, with recorded illustrations by Yehudi Menuhin, George Malcolm, (1977).
A performer's guide to baroque music (1973).
The Rise of Opera (1981).
Baroque Music: Style and Performance, a Handbook (1982).
Opera and its symbols : the unity of words, music, and staging (1990).

Articles
The Psychology of Tristan, Times Literary Supplement, 18 June 1971, pp 699–700

Sources
Sadie, S. (ed.) (1980) The New Grove Dictionary of Music & Musicians, [vol. #5].

External links 
 Obituary in Early Music, November 1990 

1907 births
1990 deaths
English musicologists
Officers of the Order of the British Empire
20th-century British musicologists
People from Leeds
People from Firle
Wagner scholars